New Jersey's 8th congressional district is currently represented by Democrat Rob Menendez, who has served in Congress since January 2023. The district is majority Hispanic and includes some of the most urban areas of New Jersey, including parts of Newark and Jersey City, as well as Elizabeth.

Counties and municipalities in the district
For the 118th and successive Congresses (based on redistricting following the 2020 Census), the district contains all or portions of three counties and 13 municipalities.

Essex County (1): 
Newark (part; also 10th)

Hudson County (11): 
Bayonne, East Newark, Guttenberg, Harrison, Hoboken, Jersey City (part; also 10th), Kearny (part; also 9th), North Bergen, Union City, Weehawken and West New York

Union County (1): 
Elizabeth

Recent statewide election results

List of members representing the district

Recent election results

2012

2014

2016

2018

2020

2022

References

 
 
 Congressional Biographical Directory of the United States 1774–present

08
Essex County, New Jersey
Passaic County, New Jersey
Constituencies established in 1893
1893 establishments in New Jersey